Madrassa Chattha is a village located in the Gujranwala district, Pakistan. It is located about 7 km west of Alipur Chattha. The village is inhabited by the Jatt Chatha Tribe and has an estimated population of about 2000 people. Most of the residents have lands in the adjoining areas and are "Zamindars". The main way to get to the village is to take a small paved path from the main Alipur-Qadirabad Road near Hazrat Keliyanwala. The village has a government primary school and also has a health dispensary.

Villages in Gujranwala District